Sarcochilus hartmannii, commonly known as the large boulder orchid,  ravine orchid, Hartmann's sarcochilus or cliff orchid''', is a lithophytic orchid endemic to eastern Australia. It forms spreading clumps with between four and ten thick, channelled leaves and up to twenty five white flowers with crimson spots near the centre.

Flowering occurs between September and November.

Taxonomy and namingSarcochilus hartmannii was first formally described in 1874 by Ferdinand von Mueller and the description was published in Fragmenta phytographiae Australiae from a specimen collected near Toowoomba by Carl Heinrich Hartmann. The specific epithet (hartmannii'') honours the collector of the type specimen.

Distribution and habitat
The large boulder orchid usually grows on boulders and cliffs, rarely on trees or cycads. It is found between Gympie in south-east Queensland and the Richmond River in New South Wales.

Conservation
This orchid is classed as "vulnerable" under the Australian Government Environment Protection and Biodiversity Conservation Act 1999 and the New South Wales Government Biodiversity Conservation Act 2016. The main threats to the species are illegal collecting and weed invasion.

References

hartmannii
Endemic orchids of Australia
Orchids of New South Wales
Orchids of Queensland
Plants described in 1874
Taxa named by Ferdinand von Mueller